The Rivergate Parkway, also historically known as Two Mile Parkway and Two Mile Pike, is a major north–south, four-lane thoroughfare in northern Davidson County in Middle Tennessee. The four-lane street is maintained by the local road department of the Metropolitan Nashville-Davidson County Government.

Road description

The road provides parking lot access to Rivergate Mall, one of the Nashville area's premier shopping centers. The street does not offer direct access to SR 386 (Vietnam Veterans Boulevard), but the street can be accessed to and from the interchange with Interstate 65 (I-65) near Goodlettsville.

Major intersections

See also

References 

Mileage retrieved from DeLorme Street Atlas USA 
Official Tennessee Highway Maps

External links
Tennessee Department of Transportation

Streets in Nashville, Tennessee
Transportation in Davidson County, Tennessee